Jacob de Witt, heer van Manezee, Melissant and Comstryen (7 February 1589 – 10 January 1674) was a burgomaster of Dordrecht and the son of a timber merchant. De Witt was an influential member of the Dutch States Party, and was in opposition to the House of Orange. He was also a younger brother of Andries de Witt and the father of Johan and Cornelis de Witt.

Career
Jacob was born in Dordrecht and was a member of the patrician De Witt family. He studied law at Leiden University and obtained a law degree there. In 1618, he became treasurer of the Synod of Dort, where he held several positions in public service, serving as burgomaster six times. He also served as emissary to Sweden along with Andries Bicker.

He was a member of the States of Holland and an opponent of William II, Prince of Orange, stadtholder of Holland and four other provinces. Together with the republican-minded brothers Cornelis and Andries de Graeff and their cousins Cornelis and Andries Bicker, De Witt supported the Peace of Münster. In May 1650 they proposed to reduce the size of the army, which was opposed by William as commander of the army.

This dispute led to a coup by William, who tried to seize Amsterdam. On 30 June 1650, William arrested De Witt and the burgomasters of Delft, Hoorn, Medemblik, Haarlem, and Dordrecht (all prominent members of the States of Holland) at the Binnenhof in The Hague. They were imprisoned in Castle Loevestein. On 17 August they were released after having reversed the reduction of the army size.

Death

In 1657 he moved to The Hague, but after the murder of his sons on 20 August 1672, on which he was brought to safety, he avoided The Hague, then spent a short time in Dordrecht where he died on 10 January 1674.

References

External links 
 

1589 births
1674 deaths
Mayors of Dordrecht
Participants in the Synod of Dort
People from Dordrecht
Dutch States Party politicians
De Witt family